Michałówka  is a village in the administrative district of Gmina Piątek, within Łęczyca County, Łódź Voivodeship, in central Poland.

In 2005 the village had a population of 58.

References
 Gmina Piątek official website

Villages in Łęczyca County